The Renfe Class 103 is a high-speed train used for the AVE service and operated in Spain by the state-run railway company RENFE. The trainset is also known as S103 or S/103.

The trains were constructed by Siemens, as the second member of the company's Velaro family.

History

On 24 March 2001, Siemens won one half of RENFE's tender to supply 32 high-speed trains for the Madrid-Barcelona high-speed rail line, offering a modified version of the ICE 3 high-speed train used by German Railways (Deutsche Bahn) for its InterCityExpress service.

The ICE 3 trains were a joint production with other Germany-based train manufacturers, who refused to supply parts or sell licenses to Siemens for the AVE Class 103. This caused a delay (for which Siemens eventually paid €21 million), during which Siemens had to re-develop the missing components. However, at the end of this development, Siemens had a complete high-speed train platform, which it named Velaro. The AVE Class 103 was intended as only the second member of a whole family after ICE 3, therefore, it was named by Siemens as the Velaro E.

During testing between Madrid and Zaragoza, on 16 July 2006, train 005 reached . This is both the current national rail speed record for Spain, and also the current speed record for a normal series train in standard configuration.

On 23 December 2005, RENFE ordered a further 10 identical trains (Siemens designation Velaro E2). Currently, all 26 trains from both orders have been delivered and are in service.

Specifications

The class has distributed traction, traction equipment was moved underfloor, with powered bogies distributed in alternate carriages along the length of the train. This removes the need for driving units at either end, which AVE Class 100 and 102 have, allowing a better use of space, better energy efficiency, better acceleration at lower speeds, and better ability to climb grades. For the AVE Class 103, four of the eight cars were fitted with two powered bogies each.

Electronically, the train is actually two identical half-trains of four coaches each, each with an independent power system, apart from the active pantograph (only a single pantograph is raised on AC-fed rail lines) and a high voltage line along the entire length of the 8-car train.

The train's capacity of 404 passengers is split between three classes; with two coupled 8-car trains total capacity is therefore 808 passengers. In the end coaches (driving trailers), glass screens separate the driver and passengers, and allow passengers the same views as the driver, just as in the ICE 3 and other Velaros. The driver can turn these opaque if necessary or preferred.

In service

The AVE Class 103 entered commercial service on 22 June 2007, between Madrid and the temporary end of the line to Barcelona near Tarragona.

Thus commercial top speed is limited to the maximum Spanish authorities approve for the line with ETCS Level 1 since 2011, .

From the opening of the Córdoba–Málaga high-speed rail line on 24 December 2007, the AVE Class 103 were also used from Madrid to Málaga.

On 20 February 2008, the final section of the Madrid–Barcelona high-speed rail line into Barcelona was opened. From that day, the AVE Class 103 were used for the faster services between Madrid and Barcelona, achieving the shortest travel time of 2h30m on the non-stop runs.

See also

 List of high speed trains
 Siemens Velaro
 Stamps with AVE Class 103
AVE Class 102

References

External links

 Velaro E specification sheet; download, archived
 Technical information AVE Series 103 Renfe page 
 Interactive 360° panoramas  of the interior of a  train AVE S103 - Siemens Velaro E

103
Passenger trains running at least at 300 km/h in commercial operations
Electric multiple units of Spain
Siemens Velaro
25 kV AC multiple units